1965 in professional wrestling describes the year's events in the world of professional wrestling.

List of notable promotions 
Only one promotion held notable shows in 1965.

Calendar of notable shows

Notable events
November  Fred Kohler Enterprises closed after 40 years of operations. World Wrestling Association, based in Indianapolis, bought the rights to promote wrestling in Chicago.

Accomplishments and tournaments

EMLL

Championship changes

EMLL

NWA

Debuts
Debut date uncertain:
Adorable Rubí
Black Man
Bobby Heenan
Bob Sweetan
Buddy Roberts
Butch Miller
Carlos Colón
Dick Murdoch
Jerry Jarrett
Jos LeDuc
Lonnie Mayne
Luke Williams
Tiger Jeet Singh
February 7  Tony Salazar
February  Ivan Koloff
April 2  Rusher Kimura
May 15  Jack Brisco
June 3  Masa Saito
June  Mil Máscaras
July 21  Kato Kung Lee
July  Rocky Johnson
November  El Cobarde
December 6  Terry Funk

Retirements
Andreas Lambrakis (1936-1965) 
John Pesek (1914-1965)

Births

January 4  Derrick Dukes 
January 11  Mascarita Sagrada
January 24:
Mike Awesome(died in 2007) 
Steve Lawler (died in 2021)
January 26  Rip Sawyer
February 2  Naoki Sano
February 21  The Terminator 
February 24  Bas Rutten
February 26  James Mitchell 
February 28  Norman Smiley
March 1  Booker T
March 3  Danie Brits (died in 2020) 
March 16  Steve Armstrong
March 24  The Undertaker
April 5  Villano IV
April 13  Bracito de Oro
April 18  Biff Wellington (died in 2007) 
April 26  Tank Abbott
May  Dick Vrij 
May 7  Owen Hart(died in 1999) 
May 8  Akitoshi Saito
June 7  Mick Foley
June 8  Tatanka
June 9  Val Puccio(died in 2011) 
June 10  Ephesto
June 11  Mascarita Sagrada
June 16  Tatsuo Nakano
June 17  Clarence Mason
July 3  Shin'ya Hashimoto(died in 2005) 
July 7  Chris Duffy (died in 2000) 
July 22  Shawn Michaels
August 7  Johnny Smith
August 12  Dr. Wagner Jr.
August 16  Masaaki Satake 
August 21  Muffy Mower 
August 26  Bobby Duncum Jr.(died in 1999) 
August 31  K. C. Thunder 
September 5  Hoshitango Imachi 
September 9  J.W. Storm
September 11  Paul Heyman
September 12  Midnight
September 16  Discovery (died in 2020)
September 27  Ricky Fuji
September 28  La Diabólica
October 11: 
Rikishi
Tonga Kid 
October 16  The Renegade(died in 1999) 
October 17  Rossy Moreno
October 21:
Charlie Norris( died in 2023) 
Horace Hogan
October 25  Too Cold Scorpio
October 27  Harvey Wippleman
October 28  Jun Izumida (died in 2017) 
November 14  L.A. Park
November 23  Don Frye
November 28  Rumi Kazama (died in 2021) 
November 30  Bart Sawyer
November 23  Ron Waterman
December 1  Noriyo Tateno 
December 6  Olímpico
December 16  Jason Neidhart
December 19  Shoichi Arai (died in 2002)
December 27  Bart Gunn

Deaths
January 16  Yukon Eric 48
May 15  Frank Townsend (wrestler) 32

References

 
professional wrestling